Patrick Choroba (born 11 June 1996) is a German-Polish professional footballer who plays as a right-back for Regionalliga West club SV Rödinghausen.

Career
Bundesliga. He began his career at TuS Lipperreihe in Oerlinghausen and later moved to the youth department of SC Verl. After his youth career, he was promoted to the reserve team competing in Landesliga Westfalen, and from 2015 he played for the first team playing in the Regionalliga West. There, Choroba became a regular starter.

Choroba moved to 3. Liga club Sonnenhof Großaspach on 29 May 2018. He made his professional debut on 28 July 2018 in a 3–2 away loss to Carl Zeiss Jena. On 25 April 2019, Choroba was suspended until the end of the season for disciplinary reasons. On 2 July 2019, Choroba and Sonnenhof Großaspach agreed to terminate the contract by mutual consent, and he returned to SC Verl. He won promotion to the 3. Liga with the club in 2020.

On 14 April 2021, Choroba signed with Regionalliga West club SV Rödinghausen.

References

1996 births
Living people
People from Gütersloh
Sportspeople from Detmold (region)
Footballers from North Rhine-Westphalia
German footballers
Polish footballers
German people of Polish descent
Association football defenders
SC Verl players
SG Sonnenhof Großaspach players
SV Rödinghausen players
3. Liga players
Regionalliga players